The 1933 All-Big Six Conference football team consists of American football players chosen by various organizations for All-Big Six Conference teams for the 1933 college football season.  The selectors for the 1933 season included the Associated Press (AP).

All-Big Six selections

Backs
 Bob Dunlap, Oklahoma (AP-1 [QB])
 Douglas Russell, Kansas State (AP-1 [HB])
 Ralph Graham, Kansas State (AP-1 [HB])
 George Sauer, Nebraska (AP-1 [FB])

Ends
 Bruce Kilbourne, Nebraska (AP-1)
 Lee Penney, Nebraska (AP-1)

Tackles
 Gail O'Brien, Nebraska (AP-1)
 Cash Gentry, Oklahoma (AP-1)

Guards
 Warren Debus, Nebraska (AP-1)
 Ellis Bashara, Oklahoma (AP-1)

Centers
 Franklin Meier, Nebraska (AP-1)

Key
AP = Associated Press

See also
1933 College Football All-America Team

References

All-Big Six Conference football team
All-Big Eight Conference football teams